Bartlettsville is an unincorporated community in Pleasant Run Township, Lawrence County, Indiana, United States.

History
Bartlettsville was platted in 1860 by Samuel J. Bartlett, and named for him. A post office was established at Bartlettsville in 1886, and remained in operation until it was discontinued in 1905.

Geography

References

Unincorporated communities in Lawrence County, Indiana
Unincorporated communities in Indiana